"Jose Chung's From Outer Space" is the 20th episode of the third season of the science fiction television series The X-Files. The episode first aired in the United States on April 12, 1996, on Fox. It was written by Darin Morgan and directed by Rob Bowman. "Jose Chung's From Outer Space" earned a Nielsen household rating of 10.5, being watched by 16.08 million people in its initial broadcast, and also received praise from critics.

The show centers on FBI special agents Fox Mulder (David Duchovny) and Dana Scully (Gillian Anderson) who work on cases linked to the paranormal, called X-Files. In this episode, Mulder and Scully hear, and promptly investigate, a story about an alien abduction of two teenagers. Each witness provides a different version of the same facts. Within the episode, a thriller novelist, Jose Chung, writes a book about the incident.

The episode is a stand-alone episode of The X-Files. While it follows the normal Monster of the Week pattern of the show, it features more humor than typical via manipulation of point of view, leading to multiple re-tellings of certain events with varying degrees of unreliable narrators.

Plot
In Klass County, Washington, a teenaged couple, Harold and Chrissy, are returning from a date one evening. After their car suddenly stops, they see a UFO and are captured by a pair of grey aliens. However, the grey aliens are themselves soon confronted by a giant third alien from another race, at which point the panicking greys address each other in perfect English.

At a later point, Agent Dana Scully (Gillian Anderson) is interviewed about the case by famed author Jose Chung (Charles Nelson Reilly), who is researching a book he is writing about alien abductions and UFO phenomena. Scully notes that Chrissy was found with all her clothes inside out, appearing to be the victim of date rape. Under questioning, Harold claims that he did not rape her, but that they were both abducted by aliens. The foul-mouthed local detective, Manners (whose profanity is humorously replaced with words such as "bleep" and "blank"), does not believe his story, but Agent Fox Mulder (David Duchovny) has Chrissy undergo hypnosis, in which she describes being on a spaceship surrounded by aliens. Harold claims to have encountered a cigarette-smoking grey alien on the ship who kept repeating, "This is not happening." Mulder is convinced that Chrissy and Harold were abducted by aliens, but Scully thinks it is more plausible that the two teenagers simply had consensual sex and are struggling to deal with the emotional aftermath.

The agents then speak to an electric power company lineman named Roky Crikenson, who claims he witnessed the abduction of Chrissy and Harold, and then turned his eyewitness account into a screenplay. He recounts a strange visit to his home from a pair of men in black, who told him that the UFO he thought he saw the night before was merely the planet Venus, and threatened to kill him if he told anyone otherwise. Roky's screenplay describes his meeting with the third alien, Lord Kinbote, who took him to the center of the Earth and told Roky that he had a great mission for him. In telling Roky's version of events to Jose Chung, Scully explains that Roky has a "fantasy-prone personality."  Mulder, however, thinks that Roky's story contains some partial truths and decides to have Chrissy re-hypnotized. This time Chrissy claims that she was captured by the U.S. military, not aliens, and they brainwashed her into believing that she was abducted.

Chung speaks to a science fiction and Dungeons & Dragons fanatic, Blaine, who frequently roams the woods of Klass County at night looking for UFOs. As Blaine tells Chung, one night he found an alien body that was subsequently recovered by Mulder, Scully and Detective Manners. Blaine thinks that Mulder and Scully are a couple of men in black. He claims that Mulder was emotionless, but shrieked when he saw the alien, and that Scully, whom Blaine believed was a man dressed like a woman, threatened him and told him not to talk to anyone about the alien body. Mulder allows Blaine to videotape Scully performing an autopsy on the alien, which is quickly released as a video "documentary" that is narrated by the Stupendous Yappi. The autopsy reveals that the alien is actually a dead Air Force pilot in a costume. His superiors arrive to claim the body, but find it missing. Mulder tricks the military officers into revealing the identity of a second missing Air Force pilot, Lieutenant Jack Schaefer.

As Mulder remembers it, that night he found Schaefer, in a dazed state, walking naked down a highway in Klass County. After getting him some clothes, Mulder takes Schaefer to a diner, where the pilot explains that he and his partner were dressed as aliens while flying a secret U.S. military vehicle designed to resemble a UFO. He thinks that he, his partner, and the two teenagers were abducted by real aliens in a real UFO, but Schaefer is also unsure if his surroundings are real or a hallucination, and he tells Mulder that he may not even exist himself, as he cannot be sure. His superiors soon come to take him away; before leaving the diner with the military officer, he tells Mulder that "I'm a dead man." The diner's cook, however, has a different version of the story. He tells Jose Chung that Mulder was in the diner by himself that night with no one else, and that he kept asking the cook strange questions about UFOs and alien abductions while ordering piece after piece of sweet potato pie.

After leaving the diner, Mulder returns to their motel and finds the men in black seen earlier (played by Jesse Ventura and Alex Trebek), in Scully's room. Scully appears to be in a trance, and has no memory of seeing the men in black. The next morning, Mulder, Scully, and Detective Manners hear about the crash of an Air Force plane and head to the crash site, where the dead bodies of the two Air Force pilots they met earlier are recovered. Mulder visits with Chung, pleading with him not to publish the book since it will further discredit UFO researchers and witnesses by making them look ridiculous. Chung dismisses Mulder and publishes the book anyway, which Scully reads in her office. In his book, Chung describes the fates of the various people he interviewed: Roky has moved to California and founded a spiritual cult based on the teachings he believes he received from Lord Kinbote, Blaine has replaced him as a power company lineman and continues to search for UFOs most nights, Mulder (whom Chung describes as "a ticking time bomb of insanity") watches video footage of Bigfoot and it's implied this is the only source of his pleasure, and Harold professes his love to Chrissy, who rejects him and tells him she no longer has interest in romance, as her UFO experience has given her a new commitment to philanthropy and helping humanity. The voice-over ends with Chung concluding that evidence of extraterrestrial life remains elusive.

Production

Disparate ideas that would eventually coalesce into "Jose Chung's From Outer Space" had been developed by writer Darin Morgan long before the script was actually written. The writer was inspired both by works he had read on hypnosis, as well as the theory that UFOs are real ships that can manipulate space and time, but they are piloted not by aliens but by the U.S. military. The episode's unique narrative style was influenced by a casting session that Morgan had attended in which an actor had mimicked the vocal styling of Truman Capote. Morgan soon thereafter developed an idea about a writer, Jose Chung, covering an X-Files. Morgan wanted to cast Rip Taylor in the role, but he was unavailable, so the role ended up going to Charles Nelson Reilly. Jesse Ventura was cast as one of the men in black, while Jeopardy! host Alex Trebek played the other. (Morgan himself had wanted Johnny Cash for the role.) Lord Kinbote was played by series stuntman Tony Morelli.

This episode would be Darin Morgan's last for the series before its revival in 2016. The writer claimed that he could not keep up with the frantic pace of the show, although he would later write the similarly themed "Jose Chung's Doomsday Defense" for the TV series Millennium.

References

The episode contains a number of references and in-jokes related to UFO culture. Klass County was named after noted skeptic Philip J. Klass, whose argument that most UFO sightings are really the planet Venus is directly invoked in the episode. The pilots dressed up as aliens were named after authors Robert Sheaffer and Jacques Vallee, who wrote often on the UFO phenomenon. Air Force Sergeant Hynek was named after UFO researcher Dr. J. Allen Hynek. The character of Roky Crikenson is named after musician Roky Erickson, who was diagnosed with paranoid schizophrenia and was known as much for erratic behavior and fantastic claims. Chung gives Mulder the pseudonym Reynard, after the legendary fox of French folklore. The alien autopsy video, Dead Alien! Truth or Humbug?, referenced both Morgan's first episode for the series, "Humbug", as well as the real Alien Autopsy: Fact or Fiction video aired by Fox in 1995. Detective Manners was named after series director Kim Manners, and the character's tendency to swear was directly influenced by his real-life counterpart. Blaine is seen wearing a t-shirt printed with the logo for the television series Space: Above and Beyond. Lt. Schaefer absent-mindedly pushing his potatoes into the shape of a mountain is a subtle reference to the film Close Encounters of the Third Kind (1977); Roky's job as a power-company lineman also alludes to Close Encounters, as Roy Neary, the character played by Richard Dreyfuss held the same position.   The cover to Jose Chung's book references the cover of the 1987 book Communion by Whitley Strieber. Lord Kinbote was an homage to Ray Harryhausen, a stop-motion animator, with the footage of the character shot at high speed, which was then edited and manually slowed in post-production, creating the illusion that it was created via stop-motion.

Reception 
"Jose Chung's From Outer Space" premiered on the Fox network on April 12, 1996. This episode earned a Nielsen rating of 10.5, with a 19 share, meaning that roughly 10.5 percent of all television-equipped households, and 19 percent of households watching television, were tuned in to the episode. This totaled 16.08 million viewers.

The cast and crew of The X-Files reacted positively to the episode. Gillian Anderson cited the episode as being among her highlights of the third season. She said the episode was like dessert, adding "That's what kept it fun and that's what kept it worth doing all the time." Chris Carter said of writer Darin Morgan, "It's been a wonderful coincidence of timing, talent, and the success of the show, allowing it to stretch in a direction it would never have been able to if it had been a less successful or if it had been a younger show. Darin is a truly original comic mind. I don't know anybody in the world working in film, and that's what we work in here even though it appears on television, who has the voice Darin has. He is one in many million." Co-Producer Paul Rabwin said of the episode "An instant classic. One of those seminal episodes. You know, when people talk about The Twilight Zone, they say 'Remember "Eye of the Beholder"?' Or "Trouble with Tribbles" on the original Star Trek. 'Jose Chung' is going to be one of those episodes that is immediately revered." Assistant director Tom Braidwood appreciated Charles Nelson Reilly's presence, saying that he captivated virtually everyone and gave everyone a lift, nicknaming everyone on the crew. Executive Producer Robert Goodwin said that the casting of Reilly was the most fun of the episode.

"Jose Chung's From Outer Space" received praise from critics as well. Author Phil Farrand rated the episode as his favorite episode of the first four seasons in his book The Nitpickers Guide to the X-Files. Entertainment Weekly gave the episode an A, writing "A series so bleepin' ripe for parody brilliantly turns the tables on itself. Two (of many) guffaw-worthy moments: Mulder's squeal and the smoking alien." Reviewer Emily VanDerWerff from The A.V. Club gave the episode a rare A+ and wrote that the episode "is one of the very finest episodes of television I've ever seen, but I'm not sure it's a terrific episode of The X-Files. [...] If The X-Files were a The Lord of the Rings-length novel, then "Jose Chung's" would be its first appendix, a source that is at once in love with the main text and critical of it, a place where real human concerns creep around the edges of the show's chilly implausibilities." VanDerWerff's colleague Zack Handlen wrote that the episode was "brilliant", but he did not feel it was as satisfying as he anticipated because it did not contribute to the series as a whole. Review website IGN named it the fourth best standalone X-Files episode of the entire series, writing, "it was 'Jose Chung's From Outer Space''' in Season 3 that showed that X-Files could create a true comedy masterpiece that almost completely broke away from the show's usual format and tone." Den of Geek listed it as the tenth best episode of the series.

See also
 Jose Chung's Doomsday Defense
 Richard Sharpe Shaver

Footnotes

Bibliography
 
 
 
 
 
 
 
 
 
 

External links

 "Jose Chung's From Outer Space" on The X-Files'' official website
 
 "Jose Chung's The Bridge to the Metamodern" (2015), a documentary cataloging intertextual references in the episode.

1996 American television episodes
Fictional books
The X-Files (season 3) episodes
Television episodes set in Washington (state)